is a Japanese four-panel manga series by Quro, serialized in Houbunsha's seinen manga magazine Manga Time Kirara Carat since January 2017. It has been collected in four tankōbon volumes. An anime television series adaptation by Doga Kobo aired from January to March 2020.

Story
During her childhood, a girl named Mira Konohata befriends Ao Manaka, who she believes is a boy, and makes a promise with Ao to discover an asteroid. Upon entering high school, Mira joins the earth sciences club, a merger of the school's astronomy and geology clubs, and reunites with Ao, who she discovers is actually a girl. Alongside their fellow club members, Mira and Ao take part in various astronomical and geological activities in the hopes of one day discovering an asteroid.

Characters

The main protagonist of the story, who joins the earth sciences club in her first year and becomes vice-president in her second year. She took an interest in astronomy after meeting Ao as a child and is determined to discover an asteroid with her.

An astronomy fanatic who was initially mistaken by Mira to be a boy when she was a child. She becomes the club's treasurer in her second year, when she also moves in with Mira to fulfill her dream with her while her parents are away.

Earth sciences club member and former member of the geology club, nicknamed "Ino-senpai", who becomes the new club president after Mari steps down. She has a crush on Ibe.

Vice-president of the earth sciences club before graduation and former president of the geology club, nicknamed "Sakura".

President of the earth sciences club before graduation and former president of the astronomy club, nicknamed "Monroe-senpai". She aspires to become an astronaut.

Mira's childhood friend, known as Suzu for short. She is particularly fond of girls and has a crush on Misa. Her family owns a bakery.

Advisor for the earth sciences club.

A girl who joins the club in Mira's second year, nicknamed "Nana". She wishes to pursue meteorology to help others after seeing her aunt suffer from flood damage.

Mikage's younger sister, nicknamed Chika, who joins the club after Mikage graduates. She shares her sister's enthusiasm for geology.

Mira's older sister who is student council president until she graduates.

Suzu's younger sister.

President of the newspaper club and Mai's friend, who prefers to be called "Eve".

Newspaper club member and Ao's classmate.

Media

Manga

Anime
An anime television series adaptation was announced in the April issue of Manga Time Kirara Carat on February 28, 2019. The series was animated by Doga Kobo and directed by Daisuke Hiramaki, with Yuka Yamada handling series composition, and Jun Yamazaki designing the characters. Takurō Iga composed the series' music. It aired from January 3 to March 27, 2020 on AT-X, Tokyo MX, SUN, KBS, TVA, and BS11. Nao Tōyama performed the series' opening theme song , while Minori Suzuki performed the series' ending theme song . It ran for 12 episodes. Crunchyroll simulcasted the series with English subtitles, while Funimation began streaming an English dub on March 6, 2020.

Video game
Characters from the series appear alongside other Manga Time Kirara characters in the 2020 mobile RPG, Kirara Fantasia.

Reception
Faye Hopper of Anime News Network noted that the show has "fundamental cuteness" but criticized for not having enough to sustain all the episodes. She further stated that Ao and Mira are "in the same position" at the end of the series as they were at the beginning, describing the connections between Ao and Mira as shallow. She specifically noted that the viewers "never understand how much Ao and Mira matter to each other," saying it never digs deep into the relationships between characters.

Notes

References

External links
  
 

Anime series based on manga
AT-X (TV network) original programming
Crunchyroll anime
Doga Kobo
Houbunsha manga
Muse Communication
Seinen manga
Slice of life anime and manga
Yonkoma